Andrew William Rutherford (9 March 1842 – 11 November 1918) was a Liberal Party Member of Parliament in New Zealand.

Biography

Early life
Rutherford was born in 1842 in New South Wales, probably near Tumut, to Scottish parents. He received his education in Brighton, a suburb of Adelaide. He came to New Zealand on 1 January 1860 on the Gundreda with his father and his brother to take up a farm.  In 1862, he took charge of another farm, Mendip Hills, on behalf of his father and of Alfred Domett. On 3 November 1873, he married Jane Monk at Waiau. His wife, 15 at the time of their marriage, was to have six sons and four daughters.

Political career

Rutherford represented the Amuri electorate on the Nelson Provincial Council from 1869 to 1871. He won the Hurunui electorate, which replaced the  electorate, in the 1902 general election, defeating Richard Meredith, who had previously represented the Ashley electorate and was also of the Liberal Party. He held the electorate until he retired in 1908.

Rutherford died during the 1918 flu pandemic on 11 November in Christchurch. He was buried at Waiau cemetery. His wife survived him by several decades and died in 1955.

References

1842 births
1918 deaths
New Zealand Liberal Party MPs
New Zealand farmers
Deaths from Spanish flu
Members of the New Zealand House of Representatives
New Zealand MPs for South Island electorates
People from the Riverina
Australian emigrants to New Zealand
New Zealand people of Scottish descent
Members of the Nelson Provincial Council
Infectious disease deaths in New Zealand